The Darwin Rugby League is a former rugby league competition based in Darwin, Northern Territory. The competition is administered by the Northern Territory Rugby League which is the body that takes care of the league's affairs. It administered the competition, officially, from 1950 in Darwin until 2010.

On 6 May 2010, the Australian Rugby League disbanded the Darwin Rugby League due to ongoing issues, including the scheduling of matches and the playing clubs arguing these changes.  The competition in Darwin is now controlled by the NTRL.

Clubs

Darwin Rugby League Champions
This is a list of the Northern Territory Rugby League 1st Grade competition champions and the runners-up for each seasons the competition existed.

See also

NRL Northern Territory
Northern Territory rugby league team
Rugby league in the Northern Territory
Rugby League Competitions in Australia

References

External links

Sport in Darwin, Northern Territory
Rugby league in the Northern Territory
Northern Territory Rugby League